Myrdal Station is a mountain railway station and junction, located on the Bergen Line regional mainline in Aurland, Vestland, Norway. The railway station is also the upper terminal of the Flåm Line local railway, which ascends from the valley floor of the Sognefjord to the mountain-top junction, providing a vital public transport link, but deriving a majority of its passengers through tourism. Most passengers using Myrdal station are changing trains between the two lines.

Location
There is no road connection to Myrdal although there are some cottages and hotels in the area, served by Myrdal Station, and the nearby Vatnahalsen Station, about a kilometer before Myrdal, and 50 metres lower towards mean sea level.

The station is located between two tunnels on the Bergen Line: the Gravahals Tunnel to the west and the Vatnahalsen Tunnel to the east.

Facilities
The station has three platforms. Platform 1 is the principal platform on the mainline, and platform 2 is the alternative mainline platform located on the passing loop. The non-consecutively numbered platform 11 is the platform used by local trains to and from Flåm. As the mainline is single track, the passing loop allows regional trains to cross with freight services, and occasionally with other passenger trains. A large cafeteria and gift shop provides refreshment and shelter, and there are waiting rooms and lavatories. There are freight sidings located at Myrdal.

History
The station opened in 1908. On 17 January 1923, the station restaurant was taken over by Norsk Spisevognselskap. As the facilities were too small, the restaurant was later moved to another, larger building.

References

Railway stations on Bergensbanen
Railway stations on the Flåm Line
Railway stations in Aurland
Railway stations opened in 1908
1908 establishments in Norway